House at 9 Park Street is a historic house in Methuen, Massachusetts.

According to the assessor's records the house at 9 Park Street was built in 1876 at a  value of $950. A notice in the Methuen Transcript says local builder Albert Fales built an addition in 1880.  according to an 1885 directory, the first owner was John W. Mann of Tompkins and Mann (paint and oil vendors), 191 Essex Street, Lawrence, Massachusetts. Mrs. Mann still occupied the house as of 1906.

It was added to the National Register of Historic Places in 1984.

See also
 National Register of Historic Places listings in Methuen, Massachusetts
 National Register of Historic Places listings in Essex County, Massachusetts

References

Houses in Methuen, Massachusetts
National Register of Historic Places in Methuen, Massachusetts
Houses on the National Register of Historic Places in Essex County, Massachusetts
Houses completed in 1876
Italianate architecture in Massachusetts